Pyroderces caesaris is a moth in the family Cosmopterigidae. It is found in Spain, Sardinia, Sicily, Italy, Croatia, Greece, Bulgaria, Romania, Moldova and Ukraine.

The wingspan is 13–15 mm. Adults are on wing from the end of May to the beginning of fall in one generation per year.

The larvae feed on Echinops ruthenicus, Centaurea orientalis, Centaurea salonitana and Cirsium sublaniflorum. They bore the flowers of their host plant and mainly feed on young fruit. After overwintering they feed on last year's fruit, but have also been recorded feeding on the pupae of other insects. Pupation takes place in the pappus of the fruit.

References

Moths described in 1957
caesaris
Moths of Europe